Kenneth Pye (birth registered first ¼ 1933) is an English former professional rugby league footballer who played in the 1950s and 1960s.

Background
Kenneth Pye's birth was registered in Pontefract district, West Riding of Yorkshire, England, he worked at Glasshoughton coking plant.

Playing career

Notable tour matches
Ken Pye played  in the combined Castleford and Featherstone Rovers teams' match against New Zealand at Wheldon Road, Castleford.

Genealogical information
Kenneth Pye is the younger brother of the rugby league footballer for Castleford; Joshua J. "Jos" Pye (birth registered third ¼ ).

References

External links
Search for "Pye" at rugbyleagueproject.org
Search for "Kenneth Pye" at britishnewspaperarchive.co.uk
Search for "Ken Pye" at britishnewspaperarchive.co.uk
Photograph 'Jack Hirst scrapbook ... names mentioned include BIll Drake…' at castigersheritage.com
Photograph 'Castleford RLFC Honours plaque 300 Club - all players who have made at least 300 appearances for Castleford' at castigersheritage.com
Photograph 'Autographs 1958-59 - Castleford 1958/59 season. Barry Walsh…' at castigersheritage.com
Photograph 'Autographs 1960s - Undated 1960s autographs - Ken Pye…' at castigersheritage.com
Photograph 'Autographed programme 1959 - 7 May 1959 Castleford v Harry Street's XIII Charlie Howard Testimonial Match official programme front page' at castigersheritage.com
Photograph 'autographed programme 1961 - 18 March 1961 Castleford v Hull KR' at castigersheritage.com
Photograph 'Autographed programme 1960 - Cut out of 17 October 1960 programme Castleford v Doncaster laid over page from Harry Street's XIII testimonial game' at castigersheritage.com
Photograph '9 February 1952. Home v Swinton RLC Cup 1st Round 1st Leg lost 4-5' at castigersheritage.com
Photograph '7 September 1953. Away v Halifax Yorkshire Cup 1st Round 2nd leg lost 9-3' at castigersheritage.com
Photograph '18 February 1954. Away v Doncaster RLC Cup 1st Round 2nd Leg lost 7-2' at castigersheritage.com
Photograph '18 August 1954. Home v Bradford Northern lost 4-8' at castigersheritage.com
Photograph '28 August 1954. Away v Batley won 8-17' at castigersheritage.com
Photograph '25 October 1954. Away v Halifax lost 18-9' at castigersheritage.com
Photograph '12 March 1955. Away v Bradford drew 23-23' at castigersheritage.com
Photograph '1956-1957 Squad' at castigersheritage.com
Photograph '1956-1957 Squad' at castigersheritage.com
Photograph '1956-1957' at castigersheritage.com
Photograph '14 August 1956. Home v Wakefield Pre-season Charity match lost 6-36' at castigersheritage.com
Photograph '10 September 1957. Home v Leeds Yorkshire Cup 2nd Round lost 6-19' at castigersheritage.com
Photograph '1957-1958' at castigersheritage.com (same photograph as http://archive.castigersheritage.com/?d=true&i=605)
Photograph '1957-1958' at castigersheritage.com (same photograph as http://archive.castigersheritage.com/?d=true&i=603&z=6)
Photograph '19 August 1958. Away v Batley won 18-21' at castigersheritage.com
Photograph '7 March 1959. Away v HKR RLC Cup 2nd Round lost 20-0' at castigersheritage.com
Photograph '12 December 1959. Away v Leeds lost 29-15' at castigersheritage.com
Photograph '1960-1961' at castigersheritage.com
Photograph '18 February 1961 Away v Doncaster won 4-8' at castigersheritage.com
Photograph '18 November 1961' at castigersheritage.com

1933 births
Living people
Castleford Tigers players
English rugby league players
Keighley Cougars players
Rugby league halfbacks
Rugby league players from Pontefract
Rugby league props